

Introduction 
Central Academy is an elementary/secondary school in Ranchi, Jharkhand. The school has often been cited as the oldest English Medium School in the city of Ranchi, dating its inception to 1965. 

The school is affiliated to the Central Board of Secondary Education, New Delhi, and follows the All India Senior Secondary School Syllabus up to +2.

Central Academy boasts of two magnificent buildings for classes from 4-8 and for classes 9-12 respectively.

Uniform 
The uniform prescribed and followed by the school is cream colored Shirt and bottle green pants, with belts with school emblem and school motto embossed on the buckle and bottle green tie. The aforementioned dress arrangement is from Monday to Thursday. Friday is observed as the House Day, when students wear their shirts belonging to their houses with white pants and without tie. Saturday as is considered as the PT day, is when the students are to wear white shirts and white pants with the tie and school belt.

Schools in Jharkhand